José "Pepe" Sellés Mas (born 25 October 1993) is a Spanish footballer who plays as a left-back.

Club career
Born in Alicante, Valencian Community, Sellés joined local Hércules CF's youth system at the age of 11. He made his competitive debut with the club on 7 September 2011, playing the first half of a 3–2 home win against CD Alcoyano for that season's Copa del Rey. In February of the following year, he was called to the Spain under-19 team for training.

On 1 April 2012, Sellés made his first appearance in Segunda División on 1 April 2012, featuring 90 minutes in the 3–1 away loss to Córdoba CF. On 14 August of the following year, he was loaned to Segunda División B side Club Recreativo Granada.

References

External links

1993 births
Living people
Spanish footballers
Footballers from Alicante
Association football defenders
Segunda División players
Segunda División B players
Tercera División players
Divisiones Regionales de Fútbol players
Hércules CF B players
Hércules CF players
Club Recreativo Granada players
CD Eldense footballers
Novelda CF players